Ethirothrips is a genus of thrips in the family Phlaeothripidae, first described by Heinrich Hugo Karny in 1925.

Species
 Ethirothrips acanthus
 Ethirothrips adventor
 Ethirothrips agasthya
 Ethirothrips anacardii
 Ethirothrips angusticornis
 Ethirothrips antennalis
 Ethirothrips australiensis
 Ethirothrips barretti
 Ethirothrips beesoni
 Ethirothrips boninensis
 Ethirothrips brevis
 Ethirothrips brevisetosus
 Ethirothrips chui
 Ethirothrips distasmus
 Ethirothrips dracon
 Ethirothrips elephas
 Ethirothrips fijiensis
 Ethirothrips firmus
 Ethirothrips giraulti
 Ethirothrips indicola
 Ethirothrips indicus
 Ethirothrips inermis
 Ethirothrips io
 Ethirothrips latapennis
 Ethirothrips longisetis
 Ethirothrips madagascariensis
 Ethirothrips meridionalis
 Ethirothrips nigrescens
 Ethirothrips obscurus
 Ethirothrips stenomelas
 Ethirothrips sybarita
 Ethirothrips tibialis
 Ethirothrips tirumalaiensis
 Ethirothrips uredinis
 Ethirothrips virgulae
 Ethirothrips vitreipennis
 Ethirothrips watsoni

References

Phlaeothripidae
Thrips
Thrips genera
Taxa named by Heinrich Hugo Karny
Taxa described in 1925